Water polo was contested for men only at the 1982 Central American and Caribbean Games in La Habana, Cuba.

References
 

1982 Central American and Caribbean Games
1982
1982 in water polo